Barbara Radford is a British figure skater who competed in ice dance.

With partner Raymond Lockwood, she won the bronze medal at the 1955 World Figure Skating Championships.

Competitive highlights 
With Raymond Lockwood

References 

Living people
British female ice dancers
Year of birth missing (living people)